Anita Yeckel (November 12, 1942 – August 26, 2015) was a Republican politician who served in the Missouri Senate, rising in seniority to the level of assistant majority floor leader. Born in Utah, she was first elected to the Missouri Senate in 1996 and served in office between 1997 through 2005. She graduated from the University of Missouri–St. Louis with a bachelor's of science degree in political science.

Yeckel sought the GOP nomination for State Treasurer of Missouri in 2004, but lost she lost to Sarah Steelman who won the general election. She had been campaign treasurer for her predecessor state Senator Irene Treppler, the first Republican woman elected to the Missouri Senate. In 1964, she married Bob Yeckel who sought to replace her in the Senate, but he lost to Democrat Harry Kennedy by about 700 votes.

She died of heart disease on August 26, 2015, in St. Louis, Missouri at age 72.

References

External links
 Funeral Monday for Anita Yeckel, 72, former state senator

1942 births
2015 deaths
20th-century American politicians
21st-century American politicians
20th-century American women politicians
21st-century American women politicians
Republican Party Missouri state senators
Women state legislators in Missouri